XL Airways Germany Flight 888T (GXL888T) was an acceptance flight for an Airbus A320 on 27 November 2008.

Background

Purpose of the test flight 
The aircraft was on a flight test (or "acceptance flight") that had taken off from Perpignan–Rivesaltes Airport, made an overflight of Gaillac, and was flying back to Perpignan Airport approaching over the sea. The flight took place following light maintenance and repainting to Air New Zealand livery in preparation for its transfer from XL Airways Germany, which had been leasing the aircraft from Air New Zealand, the owner.

Aircraft 
The aircraft involved was an Airbus A320-232, registered D-AXLA, manufactured in 2005, and assigned a manufacturer's serial number of 2500. It first flew on 30 June 2005, and was delivered to Air New Zealand's low-cost subsidiary Freedom Air with the registration ZK-OJL. Star XL German Airlines (as XL Airways Germany was named at the time) took delivery of the aircraft on 25 May 2006. The aircraft had been overhauled by a local French company located at the Perpignan–Rivesaltes Airport prior to its return off lease. At the time of the crash it was due to be delivered back to Air New Zealand and re-registered as ZK-OJL.

Passengers and crew 
Seven people were on board, two Germans (the captain and first officer, from XL Airways) and five New Zealanders (one pilot, three aircraft engineers, and one member of the Civil Aviation Authority of New Zealand (CAA)).

The captain was 51-year-old Norbert Käppel, who had been with the airline since 24 August 1987. He became an Airbus A320 captain in February 2006. Käppel had logged a total of 12,709 flight hours, including 7,038 hours on the Airbus A320.

The first officer was 58-year-old Theodor Ketzer, who had been with the airline since 2 March 1988. He had been a first officer on the Airbus A320 since April 2006. Ketzer had 11,660 flight hours, with 5,529 of them on the Airbus A320.

The pilot from New Zealand was 52-year-old Brian Horrell, who had been with Air New Zealand since September 1986. He had been an Airbus A320 captain since 27 September 2004, and had 15,211 flight hours, including 2,078 hours on the Airbus A320. Horrell was seated in the cockpit jumpseat at the time of the accident. He did not speak nor understand German.

The three aircraft engineers were 37-year-old Murray White, 49-year-old Michael Gyles, and 35-year-old Noel Marsh. The member of the CAA was 58-year-old Jeremy Cook.

Accident 
The aircraft departed Perpignan–Rivesaltes Airport at 14:44 UTC. The overflight at Gaillac was mostly normal. At 15:04, though, angle-of-attack sensor number 1 became blocked, and sensor number 2 became blocked two minutes later.

At 15:33, the aircraft started back towards Perpignan Airport, but at 15:46 UTC during final approach, the aircraft suddenly disappeared from the radar screens.

All seven people on board were killed.

Recovery 
Two bodies were recovered within hours of the crash; the others were found during later weeks. The extent of shattering of the wreckage indicated that the crash occurred at high speed. The crash area was declared a crime scene and the French justice system opened a manslaughter investigation.

Investigation
The cockpit voice recorder (CVR) was quickly found and recovered, and on 30 November, divers recovered the second flight recorder–the flight data recorder (FDR)–and a third body, unidentified at the time. Although the CVR was damaged, experts said a good probability existed of recovering data from it.

In late December, French investigators attempted to retrieve data from the CVR and FDR, but they could not be read. Usable data from the recorders was later recovered by Honeywell Aerospace in the United States.

The investigators' interest focused on the air data inertial reference unit (ADIRU) following recent similar incidents involving Airbus A330s operated by Qantas, exhibiting sudden uncommanded manoeuvring (including Qantas Flight 72). The investigation was led by the Bureau of Enquiry and Analysis for Civil Aviation Safety (BEA), with the participation of its counterparts from the German Federal Bureau of Aircraft Accident Investigation (BFU), the New Zealand Transport Accident Investigation Commission (TAIC), and the United States National Transportation Safety Board (NTSB). Specialists from Airbus and from International Aero Engines (IAE, the manufacturer of the aircraft's engines), from XL Airways Germany (operator of the aircraft), and from Air New Zealand (the owner of the aircraft), were associated with the work of the technical investigation.

Analysis of the data led to an interim finding that the crew lost control of the aircraft. The crew was not granted needed airspace to do their acceptance checklist of various test procedures, but they chose to conduct a number of the tests as they flew back to base. One of the tests that the crew unofficially fit into their flight was a test of low-speed flight, which they attempted after already dropping to a low altitude (rather than the normal ), while descending through  on full autopilot for a go-around. The stall warning sounded four times during violent manoeuvring to regain control. A second later, the aircraft crashed into the water.

In September 2010, the BEA published its final report into the accident. One of the contributing causes was incorrect maintenance procedures, which allowed water to enter the angle-of-attack (AOA) sensors. During fuselage rinsing with water before painting, three days before the flight, the AOA sensors were unprotected. As specified in the Structure Repair Manual by Airbus,  fitting a protection device on AOA sensors before these tasks is mandatory. The water was able to penetrate inside the sensor bodies, then froze in flight, rendering two of three of the sensors inoperative,  thus removing the protection they normally provided in the aircraft's flight management system.

The primary cause of the accident was that the crew attempted an improvised test of the AOA warning system, not knowing that it was not functioning properly due to the inoperative sensors. They also disregarded the proper speed limits for the tests they were performing, resulting in a stall.

The aircraft's computers received conflicting information from the three AOA sensors. The aircraft computer system's programming logic had been designed to reject one sensor value if it deviated significantly from the other two sensor values. In this specific case, this programming logic led to the rejection of the correct value from the one operative AOA sensor, and to the acceptance of the two consistent, but wrong, values from the two inoperative sensors. This resulted in the system's stall-protection functions responding incorrectly to the stall, making the situation worse, instead of better. In addition, the pilots also failed to recover from an aerodynamic stall in a manual mode in which the stabilizer had to be set to an up position to trim the aircraft. Since the stick was applied only forward, the aircraft did not trim itself because it was switched to full manual mode. Seconds later, the plane crashed into the sea.

Moreover, the stall warning in normal law was not possible. The stall warning function, though, was still available, and was triggered during the last phase of the flight.

Five safety recommendations were made following examination of the particulars of the crash.

Dramatisation
The story of the accident was featured on the 13th season of Canadian television show Mayday, an episode entitled "Imperfect Pitch".

See also
 List of accidents and incidents involving the Airbus A320 family

References

External links
Bureau of Enquiry and Analysis for Civil Aviation Safety

"Accident to an Airbus A320-232 registered D-AXLA operated by XL Airways Germany on November 27, 2008 near Canet-Plage." (Archive)
Interim report (Archive)
Final report (Archive)
 Accident d'un Airbus A320-232 immatriculé D-AXLA exploité par XL Airways Germany survenu survenu le 27 novembre 2008 au large de Canet-Plage (Archive)  – the French version is the report of record.
Interim Report  (Archive)
Final Report  (Archive)
Accidents and Incidents during Non-Revenue Flights — SKYbrary

Aviation accidents and incidents in France
Aviation accidents and incidents in 2008
Accidents and incidents involving the Airbus A320
2008 in France
Air New Zealand
November 2008 events in France
Airliner accidents and incidents caused by ice
Airliner accidents and incidents caused by stalls